Patricia Rae Peppers is an American politician who served as a member of the Montana House of Representatives from 2013 to 2021. When elected in 2012, Peppers defeated Republican incumbent Sterling Small by a margin of 1,399 to 1,080.

Montana House of Representatives

Elections
In 2012, Rae Peppers decided to run for Montana's 41st House District in the Montana House of Representatives. She was unopposed in the June Democratic primary, and in the general election she defeated incumbent Sterling Small 56%-44%. She ran unopposed in 2014 and was re-elected.

Tenure
In 2012, Peppers' son, Joshua Peppers, lost his right foot following an attack involving an IED while on duty with the U.S. Army in Afghanistan. Subsequently, in 2013 she sponsored legislation (House Bill 447) to provide scholarships for Montana Purple Heart recipients.

Committee assignments
House Appropriations Committee (2015)
House Joint Appropriations Subcommittee on Long-Range Planning (2015)

Personal life
She is a member of the Crow Tribe and resides in Lame Deer, Montana.

References

External links
 Official legislative webpage

Living people
Cheyenne people
Crow people
Democratic Party members of the Montana House of Representatives
Native American state legislators in Montana
Native American women in politics
Women state legislators in Montana
Year of birth missing (living people)
21st-century American politicians
21st-century American women politicians